All Quiet on the Preston Front is a BBC comedy drama about a group of friends in the fictional Lancashire town of Roker Bridge, and their links to the local Territorial Army infantry platoon. It was created by Tim Firth.

Episodes
Three series were made. For series two and three the title was shortened to Preston Front, and the series became less about the TA and more about the personal lives of the protagonists.

Series One
"Hodge's Girlfriend" (4 January 1994); director: Brian Farnham
"Ally's Husband" (11 January 1994); director: Brian Farnham
"Eric's Job" (18 January 1994); director: Brian Farnham
"Lloydy's Fish" (25 January 1994); director: Brian Farnham
"Diesel's Garage" (1 February 1994); director: Brian Farnham
"Kirsty's Biscuit" (8 February 1994); director: Brian Farnham

Series Two
"Dawn's Ball" (16 July 1995); director: Marcus Mortimer
"Laura's Mousse" (23 July 1995); director: Marcus Mortimer
"Spock's Leg" (30 July 1995); director: Marcus Mortimer
"Polson's Lilo" (6 August 1995); director: Betsan Morris Evans
"Diesel's Out of Body Experience" (13 August 1995); director: Betsan Morris Evans
"Lloydy's Ark" (27 August 1995); director: Betsan Morris Evans

Series Three
"Hodge's Driving Test" (21 July 1997); director: Chris Bernard
"Eric's Won Ton" (28 July 1997); director: Chris Bernard
"Lloydy's House Warming" (4 August 1997); director: Chris Bernard
"Spock's Dilated Pupil" (11 August 1997); director: Chris Bernard
"Polson's Mess" (18 August 1997); director: Rick Stroud
"Diesel's Ostrich" (1 September 1997); director: Rick Stroud
"Jeanetta's Marijuana" (8 September 1997); director: Rick Stroud

Locations
Although set in Lancashire, where the majority of filming took place, some scenes were filmed at locations in the Midlands, including The Shrubbery (the old TA Centre), Birmingham Road, Kidderminster, and the Black Country Museum.

Principal characters
Private David 'Hodge' Gadd, a garden centre assistant (Colin Buchanan)
Private Wayne 'Eric' Disley, Hodge's best friend, a bit of a "loser" (Paul Haigh)
Private Dawn Lomax, a trainee teacher (although she later leaves college) and new recruit to the transport section, Eric's girlfriend (later wife) (Caroline Catz)
Private Simon 'Spock' Matlock, a history teacher and intellectual (Stephen Tompkinson in series one, Alistair MacGowan thereafter)
Private Tony 'Lloydy' Lloyd, a farm labourer (later wealthy after inventing a successful boardgame), the platoon clown (Adrian Hood)
Private (later Lance-Corporal) Derek 'Diesel' Moyle, a garage owner (Tony Marshall)
Corporal (later Officer Cadet) Alison 'Ally' Minshull, NCO in charge of the transport section, Spock's sister, unhappily married to a local solicitor (Kate Gartside)
Corporal (later Sergeant) Peter 'Pete' Polson, the friends' section commander, a former regular NCO, now manager of a hotel leisure centre (David MacCreedy)
Jeanetta Scarry, an older woman with whom Hodge had a one-night stand five years before (Susan Wooldridge in series one and two, Carolyn Pickles thereafter)
Kirsty, Jeanetta's and Hodge's young daughter (Holly Grainger)
Lieutenant Carl Rundle, the platoon commander, a junior hotel manager, in love with Ally (Keiran Flynn)
Laura Delooze, a singer and waitress, briefly Hodge's girlfriend (Lucy Akhurst)
Peter Wang, owner of the local Chinese restaurant (Ozzie Yue)
Melanie 'Mel' Polson, Polson's younger sister, later Hodge's girlfriend (Angela Lonsdale; series three only)
Mrs Ruddock, owner of the garden centre where Hodge works (Matyelock Gibbs; series one and three)
Declan, a plastic surgeon, later Jeanetta's boyfriend (Oliver Cotton; series three only)

Awards
Best Comedy Drama, Comedy awards
RTS Award for Best Series
Best Series Award at the San Francisco Television Festival
Nominated for BAFTA Award for Best Series
Writer's Guild of Great Britain Best Original Drama Series Award
RTS Midlands Best Drama Series
Nominated for British Comedy Awards

References and notes

External links
Tim Firth's official website (writer of Preston Front): http://www.timfirth.com

The Preston Front Page

1994 British television series debuts
1997 British television series endings
1990s British comedy-drama television series
British military television series
BBC television dramas
British comedy-drama television shows
BBC Birmingham productions
English-language television shows
Television shows set in Lancashire